José Alberto Martínez (born July 25, 1988) is a Venezuelan professional baseball first baseman and outfielder for the Leones de Yucatán of the Mexican League. He previously played in Major League Baseball (MLB) for the St. Louis Cardinals, Tampa Bay Rays, and Chicago Cubs. Martínez made his major league debut with the Cardinals on September 6, 2016, after 887 games in ten minor league seasons.

As a member of the Triple-A Omaha Storm Chasers in the Kansas City Royals organization in 2015, Martínez set a modern-day Pacific Coast League (PCL) record with a .384 batting average. He also previously played in the Chicago White Sox and Atlanta Braves organizations as well as in the Frontier League.

Playing career

Chicago White Sox
Martínez signed with the Chicago White Sox as an amateur free agent in February 2006.  From 2006 to 2012, Martínez played in the White Sox organization, reaching as high as the Double-A Birmingham Barons before becoming a minor league free agent on November 2, 2012.

Atlanta Braves
On March 23, 2013, Martínez signed a minor league contract with the Atlanta Braves. He spent the year with the Mississippi Braves and was a SOU South Division All-Star. On November 4, 2013, Martínez elected free agency.

Rockford Aviators
Martínez signed with the Rockford Aviators of the Frontier League, an independent league, for the 2014 season. In his time with the Aviators, Martínez slashed .337/.375/.444 in a little over 100 at-bats.

Atlanta Braves (second stint)
On June 20, 2014, he re-signed with the Braves and was assigned to the High-A Lynchburg Hillcats, where he hit .319/.375/.444.

Kansas City Royals
On January 28, 2015, Martínez signed with the Kansas City Royals. While playing for the Omaha Storm Chasers that year, his .384 batting average broke a modern-day Pacific Coast League (PCL) record. He also led the PCL in on-base percentage (OBP, .461) and was an All-Star. He batted .382 overall in 2015–which included rehab time in the Arizona League–good for the fifth-highest mark since the modern era of the minor leagues began in 1963.  Martinez was ultimately seven hits short of batting .400 for the season.  

The Royals added Martínez to the 40-man roster on November 6, 2015, and designated him for assignment on May 18, 2016, in favor of Whit Merrifield. One week later, they traded him to the St. Louis Cardinals for cash.

St. Louis Cardinals
After 887 games with 11 minor league teams, Martínez made his major league debut on September 6, 2016, against the Pittsburgh Pirates. He ground out as a pinch-hitter in the seventh inning in his first at bat. His first major league hit and run batted in (RBI) occurred two days later, scoring Greg Garcia on an infield single in a 12−5 loss to the Milwaukee Brewers. For the season, he had 7 hits in 16 at bats.

The Cardinals announced that Martínez made their 2017 Opening Day roster, his first in the major leagues, after leading the club with 19 hits and 15 RBI in spring training. He hit his first major league home run against the Toronto Blue Jays on April 25. On August 6, 2017, Martínez hit his first major league career grand slam off Homer Bailey of the Cincinnati Reds, cementing a nine run frame for the Cardinals in a 13–4 win. For the season, he batted .309/.379/.518.

Martínez began 2018 as St. Louis' starting first baseman. On June 8, 2018, he hit two home runs off of Matt Harvey of the Cincinnati Reds at Great American Ball Park, helping St. Louis defeat the Reds 7-6 in ten innings. He finished his 2018 campaign slashing .305/.364/.457 with 17 home runs and 83 RBIs in 152 games, and led the majors in percentage of balls hit to the opposite field (34.7%), as well as in percentage of soft-hit batted balls (34.7%).

In February 2019, Martínez signed a two-year, $3.25 million contract with St. Louis. For the 2019 regular season, he batted .269/.340/.410 with ten home runs and 42 RBIs over 128 games.

Tampa Bay Rays
On January 9, 2020, Martínez was traded to the Tampa Bay Rays along with Randy Arozarena and the Cardinals’ Competitive Balance Round A draft pick in exchange for Matthew Liberatore, Edgardo Rodriguez, and the Rays’ pick in Competitive Balance Round B.

Chicago Cubs
On August 30, 2020, Martinez was traded to the Chicago Cubs in exchange for Pedro Martinez and cash considerations. On December 2, Martinez was non-tendered by the Cubs.

New York Mets
On January 14, 2021, Martínez signed a one-year, split contract with the New York Mets, which includes a $1 million option if he makes the team after spring training. On March 7, 2021, Martínez suffered a torn meniscus in his left knee after colliding with an umpire trying to field a ground ball, forcing him to be out for about four months. On April 1, Martínez was placed on the 60-day injured list. He played on a rehab assignment for the Syracuse Mets, but injured his elbow. Martínez elected free agency on October 29, without having appeared in a game for the Mets.

Acereros de Monclova
On March 15, 2022, Martínez signed with the Acereros de Monclova of the Mexican League. On Opening Day, he suffered a broken hand and was later put on the injured list. Martínez was released by the club on May 20, 2022.

Leones de Yucatán
On June 13, 2022, Martínez signed with the Leones de Yucatán of the Mexican League.

Personal life
Martínez is a son of former infielder Carlos Martínez, who played seven seasons in MLB for the Cleveland Indians, White Sox and California Angels. He lives in Edwardsville, Illinois during the season.

Martínez has two children; one son, and one daughter.

See also

 List of Major League Baseball players from Venezuela
 List of second-generation Major League Baseball players

References

External links

1988 births
Living people
People from La Guaira
Major League Baseball players from Venezuela
Venezuelan expatriate baseball players in Mexico
Venezuelan expatriate baseball players in the United States
Major League Baseball first basemen
Major League Baseball left fielders
Major League Baseball right fielders
Major League Baseball designated hitters
St. Louis Cardinals players
Tampa Bay Rays players
Chicago Cubs players
Arizona League Royals players
Birmingham Barons players
Bristol White Sox players
Kannapolis Intimidators players
Lynchburg Hillcats players
Memphis Redbirds players
Mississippi Braves players
Omaha Storm Chasers players
Tiburones de La Guaira players
Venezuelan Summer League Orioles/White Sox players
Winston-Salem Dash players
Rockford Aviators players
Palm Beach Cardinals players
Syracuse Mets players
Acereros de Monclova players
Venezuelan expatriate baseball players in Colombia